New Smyrna Beach is a city in Volusia County, Florida, United States, located on the central east coast of the state, with the Atlantic Ocean to the east. Its population is 30,142 in 2020 by the United States Census Bureau.
The downtown section of the city is located on the west side of the Indian River and the Indian River Lagoon system. The Coronado Beach Bridge crosses the Intracoastal Waterway just south of Ponce de Leon Inlet, connecting the mainland with the beach on the coastal barrier island.

The surrounding area offers many opportunities for outdoor recreation; these include fishing, sailing, motorboating, golfing, and hiking. Visitors participate in water sports of all kinds, including swimming, scuba diving, kitesurfing, and surfing. In July 2009, New Smyrna Beach was ranked number nine on the list of "best surf towns" in Surfer. It was recognized as "one of the world's top 20 surf towns" by National Geographic in 2012. It has also been dubbed "The Shark Bite Capital of the World."

History

The area was first settled by Europeans in 1768, when Scottish physician Dr. Andrew Turnbull, a friend of James Grant, the governor of British East Florida, established the colony of New Smyrna. Dr. Turnbull had married Gracia Dura Bin (some sources give her name as Maria Gracia Rubini), the daughter of a Greek London merchant from the Ottoman city of Smyrna (modern-day İzmir in Turkey) and named the settlement in honor of his wife's birthplace, and the homeland of some of those in his future labor force who were Greek from the Mani peninsula. No one had previously attempted to settle so many people at one time in a town in North America.

Turnbull recruited about 1,300 settlers, intending for them to grow hemp, sugarcane, and indigo, as well as to produce rum, at his plantation on the northeastern Atlantic coast of Florida. The majority of the colonists came from Menorca (historically called "Minorca" in English), one of the Mediterranean Balearic Islands of Spain, and were of Catalan culture and language. Around 500 or so came from the Mani peninsula of Greece.

Although the colony produced relatively large amounts of processed indigo in its first few years of operation, it eventually collapsed after suffering major losses due to insect-borne diseases and Indian raids, and growing tensions caused by mistreatment of the colonists on the part of Turnbull and his overseers. The survivors, about 600 in number, marched nearly 70 miles north on the King's Road and relocated to St. Augustine, where their descendants live to this day. In 1783, East and West Florida were returned to the Spanish, and Turnbull abandoned his colony to retire in Charleston, South Carolina.

The St. Photios Greek Orthodox National Shrine on St. George Street in St. Augustine honors the Greeks among the settlers of New Smyrna; they were the first Greek Orthodox followers in North America. The historical exhibit adjoining the chapel tells the story of their plight, with accompanying exhibits, and of their contributions to the city.

Central Florida remained sparsely populated by white settlers well into the 19th century, and it was frequently raided by Seminole Indians trying to protect their territory. United States troops fought against them in the Seminole Wars, but they were never completely dislodged. 

During the Civil War, on March 23, 1862, portions of the 3rd Florida Infantry Regiment defeated a small U.S. naval force that was attempting to land near New Smyrna. Later on, in 1863, the "Stone Wharf" was shelled by Union gunboats.

In 1887, when New Smyrna was incorporated, it had a population of 150. In 1892, Henry Flagler provided service to the town via his Florida East Coast Railway. This led to a rapid increase in the area's population. Its economy grew as tourism was added to its citrus and commercial fishing industries.

During Prohibition in the 1920s, the city and its river islands were popular sites for moonshine stills and hideouts for rum runners, who came from the Bahamas through Mosquito Inlet, now Ponce de León Inlet. "New Smyrna" became "New Smyrna Beach" in 1947, when the city annexed the seaside community of Coronado Beach. Today, it is a resort town of over 20,000 permanent residents.

Like St. Augustine, established by the Spanish, New Smyrna has been under the rule of four "flags": the British, Spanish, United States (from 1821, with ratification of the Adams–Onís Treaty), and the Confederate Jack. After the end of the Civil War in 1865, it returned with Florida to the United States.

Geography
New Smyrna Beach's motto is cygnus inter anates, which is Latin for "a swan among ducks." The city is located in the so-called "Fun Coast" region of the state of Florida, a regional term created by the Daytona Beach/Halifax area Chamber of Commerce. This coincides with the local area code, 386, which spells FUN on touchtone phones. It is bordered by the city of Port Orange to the northwest, unincorporated Volusia County to the north, the census-designated place of Samsula-Spruce Creek to the west, and the cities of Edgewater and Bethune Beach and the Canaveral National Seashore to the south. Bounded on the east by the Atlantic Ocean, New Smyrna Beach is on the Indian River. The city is connected to other parts of the state by Interstate 95, U.S. Route 1, and State Road 44.

Climate

Like the rest of Florida north of Lake Okeechobee, New Smyrna Beach has a humid subtropical (Köppen Cfa) climate characterized by hot, humid summers and warm, mostly dry winters. The rainy season lasts from May until October, and the dry season, from November to April. New Smyrna averages only about two freezes per year, and many species of subtropical plants and palms are grown in the area. The city has recorded snowfall only three times in its 250-year history. The summers are long and hot, with frequent severe thunderstorms in the afternoon, as central Florida is the lightning capital of North America. Winters are pleasant with frequent sunny skies and dry weather.

Weather hazards include hurricanes from June until November, though direct hits are rare. Hurricane Charley exited over New Smyrna Beach on August 13, 2004, after crossing the state in a northeastern direction from its initial landfall in Punta Gorda. The storm caused extensive damage to the beachside portion of the city and toppled many historic oak trees in the downtown area and along historic Flagler Avenue.

Demographics

As of the census of 2010, 22,464 people, 11,074 households, and 6,322 families resided in the city. The 16,647 housing units averaged 491.9 per square mile (189.9/km2). The racial makeup of the city was 90.8% White, 5.9% African American, 0.3% Native American, 1.1% Asian, 0.5% from other races, and 1.4% from two or more races. Hispanics or Latinos of any race were 2.8% of the population.

Of the 11,074 households, 14.8% had children under the age of 18 living with them, 44.1% were married couples living together, 9.4% had a female householder with no husband present, and 42.9% were not families. About 35.3% of all households were made up of individuals, and 18.2% had someone living alone who was 65 years of age or older. The average household size was 2.01 and the average family size was 2.54.

In the city, the population was distributed as 13.9% under the age of 18, 3.6% from 20 to 24, 17.9% from 25 to 44, 31.3% from 45 to 64, and 31.6% who were 65 years of age or older. The median age was 54.3 years. Females were 52.1% of the population, and males were 47.9%.

The median income for a household in the city was $49,625, and for a family was $62,267. Males had a median income of $38,132 versus $32,087 for females. The per capita income for the city was $31,013. About 10.9% of families and 13.0% of the population were below the poverty line, including 21.9% of those under age 18 and 8.3% of those aged 65 or over.

The population continues to increase with new condominium development.

Education
All public education is run by Volusia County Schools.

Elementary schools
 Chisholm Elementary
 Coronado Beach Elementary
 Read-Pattillo Elementary
 Sacred Heart School (private)
 Indian river Elementary
 Burns science and technology (Charter)

Middle schools
 New Smyrna Beach Middle School
 Sacred Heart School (private Catholic)
 Burns science and technology (Charter)

High schools
New Smyrna Beach High School
Burns science and technology (Charter)

Higher education 

 Daytona State College (New Smyrna Beach Campus)

Culture

Named one of "America's Top Small Cities for the Arts", New Smyrna Beach is home to the Atlantic Center for the Arts, an artists-in-residence community and educational facility, the Harris House, the Little Theatre, and a gallery of fine arts, Arts on Douglas.  Arts shows featuring visual and performing arts occur throughout the year.

The New Smyrna Speedway is a half-mile paved racetrack opened in 1967 that currently hosts the ARCA Menards Series East, NASCAR Whelen Modified Tour, Southern Super Series and World Series of Asphalt Stock Car Racing.

Shark attacks
According to the International Shark Attack File maintained by the University of Florida, in 2007, Volusia County had more confirmed shark bites than any other region in the world. Experts from the university have referred to the county as having the "dubious distinction as the world's shark-bite capital". The trend continued in 2008, when the town broke its own record, with 24 shark bites. An Orlando Sentinel photographer shot a picture of a four-foot spinner shark jumping over a surfer, a reversal of "jumping the shark".
Sharks bit three different surfers on September 18, 2016, in the span of a few hours at the same beach. Very few of the shark bites are fatal.

Government
Elected city government officials include:
 Fred Cleveland – Mayor
 Valli Perrine – Zone 1 commissioner
 Lisa Martin – Zone 2 commissioner
 Jason McGuirk – Zone 3 commissioner
 Randy Hartman – Vice Mayor and Zone 4 commissioner

Notable people

Joseph Barbara, actor best known for the soap opera Another World
Emory L. Bennett, United States Army soldier in the Korean War, Medal of Honor winner
The Beu Sisters, music recording artists
Joyce Cusack, Florida politician and retired registered nurse
Suzanne Kosmas, Former U.S. Representative for Florida's 24th congressional district
Jimmy McMillan, political activist, perennial candidate, Vietnam War veteran, and founder of the Rent is Too Damn High political party
Walter M. Miller, Jr., author of A Canticle for Liebowitz
Jack Mitchell, photographer and author of dance and iconic artist images
Jim Parsley, American stock car racing driver
Bob Ross, American painter, art instructor, and television host

Athletes

Dallas Baker, University of Florida alumnus, and professional football wide receiver, current assistant football coach at Buffalo
Perry Baker, professional rugby player with the United States national rugby sevens team
Laura Brown, former American college and professional golfer
Wes Chandler, University of Florida alumnus, and professional football player in the National Football League (NFL) for 11 seasons during the 1970s and 1980s
Eric Geiselman, professional surfer with the world surf league
Chris Isaac, former quarterback with the Ottawa Rough Riders of the Canadian Football League
Raheem Mostert, football running back and kickoff returner for the Miami Dolphins of the NFL
Duffy Waldorf, professional golfer, former member of the PGA Tour who plays on the Champions Tour

Gallery

References

Further reading
 Grange, Roger. "Saving Eighteenth-Century New Smyrnea: Public Archaeology in Action." Present Pasts vol 3 #1 (2011). online
 Panagopoulos, Epaminondas P. "The Background of the Greek Settlers in the New Smyrna Colony." Florida Historical Quarterly 35.2 (1956): 95–115.  in JSTOR
 Panagopoulos, Epaminondas P. New Smyrna: An Eighteenth Century Greek Odyssey (University of Florida Press, 1966)

External links

New Smyrna Beach Regional Library
New Smyrna Beach Museum of History
Atlantic Center for the Arts
New Smyrna Beach Area Visitors Bureau, official tourism information
New Smyrna Beach tide information
A History of Central Florida Podcast – European Earthenware, St. Benedict Medal, Print Culture

 
Cities in Volusia County, Florida
Cities in Florida
Greek-American culture in Florida
Populated coastal places in Florida on the Atlantic Ocean
Populated places established in 1768
Former county seats in Florida
Beaches of Volusia County, Florida
Beaches of Florida
1768 establishments in the British Empire